Neosphaleroptera is a genus of moths belonging to the subfamily Tortricinae of the family Tortricidae. It contains only one species, Neosphaleroptera nubilana, which is found in almost all of Europe and the Near East.

The wingspan is 12–14 mm. Adults are on wing from June to July.

The larvae feed on Crataegus, Prunus and Pyrus species. They spin together the leaves of their host plant and feed from within.

See also
List of Tortricidae genera

References

External links
tortricidae.com

Moths described in 1799
Cnephasiini
Tortricidae of Europe
Insects of Turkey
Tortricidae genera